The Hódmezővásárhely Ladies Open was a tennis tournament held on outdoor clay courts at Hódmezővásárhely, Hungary. It was held from 2016 to 2018 and was part of the ITF Women's Circuit as a $60,000 event.

Past finals

Singles

Doubles

External links
 

ITF Women's World Tennis Tour
Clay court tennis tournaments
Tennis tournaments in Hungary
Recurring sporting events established in 2016
Recurring sporting events disestablished in 2018
Defunct sports competitions in Hungary